Clay Morgan Shepherd (born October 12, 1941) is an American retired professional stock car racing driver and current team owner. He last competed part-time in the NASCAR Xfinity Series, driving the No. 89 Chevrolet Camaro for Shepherd Racing Ventures. He is a born again Christian who serves as a lay minister to the racing community. He competed in NASCAR for over 50 years, having one of the longest careers in the sport.
Shepherd became the second-oldest race winner (after Harry Gant) in 1993, when he won the spring race at Atlanta at the age of 51 years, 4 months, and 27 days. He holds the record for oldest driver to start a race NASCAR's top three series at age 77, as well as oldest starter in the NASCAR Cup Series race at the 2014 Camping World RV Sales 301 at age 72.

Racing career

Career before NASCAR

Shepherd's racing career began in 1967 when he started racing Late models at Hickory Motor Speedway nearby his home. Shepherd proved to be fast but he crashed out quite often in his early days. In 1968, Shepherd started racing full-time at a Hobby division in Hickory, driving a 1955 Chevy. That year Shepherd won 21 out of 29 races. The next year Shepherd drove the same car this time with a 1957 Chevy body on the car. After winning seven races early in the year he wrecked, which almost destroyed his car. Shepherd did not win another race that year after putting a 1966 Chevy body on the car. Shepherd later sold this car to Harry Gant.

Shepherd's career was on its way in 1970. He built his own cars and raced at several different racetracks in the Southeast. Personal problems during the seventies slowed down Shepherd's career. In a religious experience, Shepherd accepted Christ as his personal savior. He was looking to get control of his life, and his career got back on track in 1975. Shepherd took every racing opportunity he was offered and drove for 17 different car owners during 1975. He finished second in the NASCAR Sportsman national championship to L. D. Ottinger. At last, Shepherd got his big break in 1978 after he met Cliff Stewart, who owned a western North Carolina furniture factory. With Stewart as his owner, Shepherd won the 1980 NASCAR Sportsman Series (now known as the Xfinity Series). During this year, Shepherd won 9 races and finished second 21 times. The Shepherd-Stewart combo moved to what was then the Winston Cup Series for the 1981 season.

Winston Cup Series

Early days

Shepherd made his Winston Cup Series debut in 1970 at Hickory Motor Speedway, driving the No. 93 Chevy for Bill Flowers. He started tenth but finished nineteenth out of twenty-two cars due to rear-end failure. Shepherd made two more starts for Flowers that year but failed to finish in both of them. His best finish that year was a fourteenth place at Hickory.

Shepherd would not return to the Cup Series until 1977, driving a Mercury for Jim Makar. He first attempted the Daytona 500 that year but he failed to make the race. Later that year Shepherd took his first top-ten finish at Dover International Speedway. He also ran two additional races at Charlotte Motor Speedway and Atlanta Motor Speedway. Shepherd stayed with Makar for the 1978 season, qualifying for his first Daytona 500. Shepherd started the race in 37th place but only finished 40th when his engine failed after only eight laps. He only ran one additional race that season, finishing twelfth at Charlotte. Shepherd only attempted the Daytona 500 with Makar in 1979, but failed to make the race.

Full-time Cup Series switch
Shepherd moved to the Winston Cup Series full-time in 1981, driving the No. 5 Pontiac for Cliff Stewart. They missed the first two races of the season, Riverside and the Daytona 500. Shepherd took pole position in his first race for Stewart at Richmond, finishing the race in fourth position. A few races later Shepherd won his first Winston Cup race at Martinsville.  The win marked the first win for Pontiac in 18 years. Shepherd dominated the race and led a total of 203 laps. Shepherd left Stewart's team after the Talladega 500 after he had a falling out with his team. For the next race at Michigan Shepherd drove for Bud Reeder his team. Shepherd qualified in the fourteenth position but retired from the race after he crashed on lap twenty. For the next couple of races Shepherd drove for Cecil Gordon and his team, finishing in the top ten at North Wilkesboro and Charlotte. During the last part of the season, Shepherd also drove some races for Ron Benfield. Shepherd finished thirteenth in points with ten top-ten finishes.

Shepherd moved to Benfield's team full-time in 1982, driving the No. 98 Buick. Although Shepherd did not win a race that season, he scored six top-five finishes with a best finish of third at Bristol early in the season. Shepherd also won the pole at Nashville and Atlanta, respectively, but retired from both those races with engine troubles. Shepherd finished tenth in points that season with a total of thirteen top-ten finishes.

Shepherd started the 1983 season without a full-time ride. He tried to qualify for the Daytona 500 driving for Bud Reeder; however, he failed to make the race. Shepherd then drove the Richmond 400 for Wayne Beahr but did not finish the race. Shepherd returned to Cecil Gordon for the TranSouth 500 and later drove the Virginia National Bank 500 for Emanuel Zervakis. After that race, Shepherd drove for Jim Stacy's team for the rest of the season. Shepherd scored thirteen top-ten finishes during the rest of the season, with a best finish of second at Firecracker 400. His abbreviated season dropped Shepherd to twentieth in the final points standings.

Going from ride to ride

For the next couple of years, Shepherd did not have a full-time ride and practically picked up whatever he could find. Shepherd started off his 1984 season at Richmond driving the No. 2 Buick for Robert Harrington. Shepherd drove two races for Charlie Henderson early in the season. He also drove four races for Dick Bahre his team, with a best finish of seventeenth at the 1984 World 600. Shepherd made one start for Phil Barkdoll at Michigan finishing the race in the 22nd position. After driving the No. 6 Buick for D. K. Ulrich and the No. 52 Chevy for Jimmy Means, Shepherd drove six races for Roger Hamby. Shepherd had two top twenty finished for Hamby, with a best finish of twelfth at Richmond. Shepherd made another start for Ulrich at Charlotte, before rounding off the season driving the No. 98 Chevy for Ron Benfield. Shepherd scored his only top ten finish that season at Rockingham, finishing in sixth position.

Shepherd finished his first Daytona 500 in 1985, driving the No. 67 Chrysler for Buddy Arrington. Shepherd spent the rest of the season going from ride to ride. He returned to the team of Dick Bahre, driving the No. 23 Chevy at Rockingham. He also made a start for Petty Enterprises at the TranSouth 500. Shepherd fielded his own car at Talladega, finishing the race in thirteenth place. Shepherd made four races for Bobby Hawkins, with a best finish of fifth at Atlanta. He made most of his starts that season for Helen Rae Smith, but failed to finish all of those seven races.

Shepherd moved to the team of Jack Beebe in 1986, driving on a part-time basis. He had a good start to the season, finishing fourth at the 1986 Goodwrench 500. At the next race in Atlanta, Shepherd led 97 laps and held off Dale Earnhardt to win his second career Winston Cup race. Shepherd got very emotional at the final laps of the race. "I was trying not to cry. I knew I had to keep my self-control because we were so close to finally winning a big one, a major race. My racing career was nearly gone just a year before, and I was getting ready to win a big one." Shepherd made ten more starts for Beebe that season, scoring four top-ten finishes. After making several starts for RahMoc Enterprises mid-season, he moved to the team full-time after the Southern 500. Shepherd scored two additional top-ten finishes for RahMoc Enterprises and finished the season eighteenth in points.

Late 1980s and early 1990s

Shepherd joined King Racing for the 1987 season, driving the No. 26 Quaker State Buick Lesabre owned by drag racing legend Kenny Bernstein. It was the first time in Shepherd's Cup career that he competed in every scheduled event. Shepherd scored eleven top-ten finishes; seven of those were in the top five. He also scored his fourth career pole st Martinsville. He led the early part of that race but retired after engine problems. His best finish of the season was at the Coca-Cola 600, where Shepherd finished second to Kyle Petty.

Shepherd switched to Tom Winkle's team for the 1988 season. Shepherd had a good start to the season, with a pole at Richmond and a top-ten at Rockingham. However, after that race Shepherd started racing for his own team, driving a Buick. After failing to finish a race with his own team he moved to Mach 1 Racing, replacing the injured Harry Gant. Shepherd led 110 laps at Dover, eventually finishing second to Bill Elliott. After Gant returned Shepherd again replaced an injured driver, this time Neil Bonnett at RahMoc Enterprises. In his first race for this team, at Pocono, Shepherd took his second pole of the year. After posting two top-tens in the No. 88 Oldsmobile for Buddy Baker, Shepherd finished out the year in his own No. 57, before his team was purchased by RahMoc for the season finale.

He returned to RahMoc for the 1989 season. Shepherd scored thirteen top-ten finishes during the season. He led the most laps at the Talladega DieHard 500 but eventually finished the race in sixth place. Shepherd took his final career pole at Watkins Glen. He led the early parts of that race but lost his chance of winning the race after contact with Geoff Bodine. Shepherd's best finish of the season was two second-place finishes at the Pepsi 400 and the Champion Spark Plug 400. It was only the second time in his career Shepherd competed in every scheduled event. He finished thirteenth in the final points standings.

Shepherd moved to Bud Moore Engineering for the 1990 season, driving the No. 15 Ford. He had a great start to the season finishing in the top ten in each of the first eleven races. Shepherd took the championship lead for the first (and only) time in his career after the Budweiser 500. He had a difficult midseason, losing the points lead and dropping to tenth in the standings after the Tyson Holly Farms 400. Shepherd ended his season on a high after winning his third career race at the season finale at Atlanta. He finished fifth in the final points standings, which would turn out to be a career-high.

He stayed with Bud Moore for the 1991 season, but had a more up and down season than the year before. Although Shepherd scored fourteen top-ten finishes he could not compete for regular top-five finishes during the season. His best finish of the season was two third-place finishes late in the season. He had his best run of the season at North Wilkesboro, where Shepherd led a total of 41 laps and just missed out on the win. Shepherd dropped to twelfth in the final points standings. After the season Shepherd left Bud Moore Engineering and moved to the Wood Brothers for the 1992 season.

Wood Brothers Racing

Shepherd joined Wood Brothers Racing in 1992, driving the No. 21 Citgo Ford. He came short of winning the Daytona 500, finishing second to Davey Allison. Even though Shepherd scored eleven top-ten finishes during the season he dropped to fourteenth in the final points standings. Shepherd had a good run at Dover early in the season, where he led 52 laps, but he dropped back at the end of the race.

Shepherd improved to seventh in points in 1993. Shepherd scored a total of fifteen top-ten finishes during the season. He became the second-oldest race winner when he won the spring race at Atlanta at the age of 51 years, 4 months, and 27 days. Shepherd took the race lead with 12 laps to go and cruised across the finish line. It turned out to be Shepherd's final Winston Cup Series win. The Wood Brothers would not return to Victory Lane until Elliott Sadler won the Food City 500 in 2001.

Shepherd continued his good run for the Wood Brothers in 1994. He equaled his career-best top-tens in one season with sixteen, nine of those were top-five finishes. Shepherd came close to winning his fourth race at Atlanta, but just came short and finished second to Ernie Irvan. Shepherd also came close to winning the Mello Yello 500 at the end of the season but was passed by Dale Jarrett during the last four laps of the race. Shepherd finished sixth in the final points standings with a career-best 4029 points in a season.

Shepherd stayed with the Wood Brothers for the 1995 season. He had a decent season but dropped to eleventh in the points standings. Shepherd scored ten top-ten finishes during the season. He had his best run at Loudon, where Shepherd finished second to Jeff Gordon. After the 1995 season, Shepherd was replaced by Michael Waltrip, as Citgo wanted a younger driver. At that time Shepherd was 53 years old.

Late 1990s and career decline

Shepherd signed for Butch Mock Motorsports to drive for them in the 1996 season, driving their No. 75 Ford with sponsorship from Remington Arms. Shepherd scored five top-tens during the season, with a best finish of fifth at the Brickyard 400. He also had a good run going at the Miller 400, where Shepherd led 44 laps in the early part of the race. Shepherd finished nineteenth in the final points standings. Despite a solid season, Shepherd decided to leave the No. 75 team at the end of the season. 1996 would also turn out to be Shepherd's last season where he competed in every scheduled event.

Shepherd moved to Precision Products Racing for the 1997 season, driving the No. 1 Pontiac. Shepherd finished tenth at the Goodwrench Service 400, scoring his first top-ten of the year. He had his best run of the season in Atlanta. Shepherd looked strong all race and was a contender for the win, but eventually he finished the race in third place. This was Shepherd's last top-five finish in Winston Cup competition. Shepherd finished ninth at the Coca-Cola 600. This would turn out to be Shepherd's last top ten finish in Cup racing. After the Pocono 500, Shepherd left Precision Products Racing and switched to Jasper Motorsports, driving their No. 77 Ford.  Shepherd struggled at Jasper Motorsports and only managed to qualify for five of the eleven races he entered with the team. After failing to qualify for the Exide NASCAR Select Batteries 400, he departed and rejoined PPR, now with R+L Carriers sponsorship. His best finish for the rest of the season was a twelfth place at Talladega Superspeedway.

After beginning 1998 without a ride, Shepherd brought out his own team to attempt the races at Rockingham, Atlanta and Darlington, but his No. 05 Pontiac failed to qualify in all three races. In the following race at Bristol, Shepherd drove the No. 46 First Union Chevy for Team SABCO, finishing 24th, before substituting for Mike Skinner for two races, finishing eleventh at Martinsville. Shepherd also had a good run at Talladega, where he qualified in fifth place. After another race for SABCO and a one-off deal for Stavola Brothers Racing at Michigan International Speedway, where he finished 43rd, Shepherd spent most of the season with LJ Racing, his best finish 15th at the Brickyard 400. He left the team late in the season and closed the year in the No. 8 Chevy for the Stavola Brothers. Shepherd had a good run and was running in the top ten, until he made contact with Jeff Gordon and wrecked, finishing 39th.

Shepherd attempted the 1999 Daytona 500 for Pinnacle Motorsports, but he failed to make the race. He made his only Cup start that season the following week at North Carolina in the No. 90 Ford Taurus for Donlavey Racing, where he started 39th and finished 32nd, five laps down. In May 1999, Shepherd announced he was partnering with Rhea Fain to field the No. 05 Wendy's Pontiac. After the team failed to qualify for the Coca-Cola 600, the partnership dissolved, and Shepherd failed in each of his attempts to qualify for a Cup race that season.

Shepherd only attempted one race in 2000, driving the No. 80 Ford for Hover Motorsports in the season finale at Atlanta. He failed to make the race as Shepherd set the 49th-fastest time in qualifying. Shepherd returned to Hover Motorsports for the 2001 Daytona 500, but failed to qualify. Shepherd also attempted the season finale at Loudon driving for his own team, but he failed to make the race.

Cup return with his own team

Shepherd started racing for his own team on a part-time basis in 2002, driving the No. 89 Ford. He attempted his first race at Loudon, qualifying in 43rd position. Shepherd finished the race in 40th position. As his team practically received no sponsorship money, Shepherd was unable to compete for full races and he often had to park early to save money and resources. At the next race in Pocono, Shepherd qualified 43rd and finished 42nd, after leading during a rain delay. He made six more attempts in the No. 89 and qualified for three of them, with his best finish of 40th at Kansas. Shepherd also made two additional starts for Ware Racing Enterprises, but he failed to make the race at Dover and Talladega.

Shepherd had to cut back on his Cup schedule in 2003 and only attempted seven races that year. He started his season at the Pocono 500, but was the slowest car in qualifying and did not make the race. Shepherd did make the race at the New England 300 where he parked after 43 laps and finished in last position. He qualified in 42nd-place at the next race in Pocono, but only run for 44 laps and finished in 43rd. Shepherd attempted four additional races that season but failed to make any of those races.

For the 2004 season Shepherd Racing Ventures switched to Dodge. The team increased their schedule, attempting 32 of the 36 races. Shepherd had a good start to the season, qualifying for the first race he attempted at Las Vegas. The No. 89 team did not have sufficient sponsorship money to complete the races, so Shepherd sometimes had to park his car early to save money. Shepherd had his best run at the spring race of Martinsville, finishing in 32nd position. Shepherd last finished a Cup race in 1999. Shepherd also ran the full race at the summer Daytona race, finishing in 33rd place. Shepherd qualified for 19 races that year. Shepherd started his 500th Cup start at the Siemens 300 at the New Hampshire International Speedway. He qualified in 41st position and finished in 40th place after running 192 of the 300 laps. He finished 42nd in the final points standings.

As Shepherd and his team received almost no money from sponsors whatsoever, they had to cut back on their 2005 schedule. Shepherd attempted to qualify for the 2005 Daytona 500 but missed the race after he was caught up in a wreck during the Gatorade Duels. This was a big blow to Shepherd's season as he needed the prize money to compete in all the races. Shepherd qualified for the next race he entered at Las Vegas. This was a much-needed break as his team needed the prize money to keep racing. Shepherd eventually managed to qualify for four of the 21 races he entered that season. He finished 63rd in the 2005 points standings.

Shepherd's struggles continued in 2006. His team had to cut on their schedule and only entered 15 races that year. Shepherd failed to qualify for the first 9 races he entered in 2006. He made his first race of the year at the Chevy Rock & Roll 400, where he finished 43rd. The following week, he qualified for the Sylvania 300 and finished 42nd. Shepherd failed to make any additional races for the rest of the year. He finished 66th in the final points standings. Shepherd shut down his cup team after the season and moved to the Busch Series for 2007.

Oldest driver to start Sprint Cup race

Shepherd ran the Camping World RV Sales 301 at New Hampshire Motor Speedway for Brian Keselowski Motorsports, his first Sprint Cup race since 2006, becoming the oldest driver to race in the Sprint Cup at an age of 71 years, nine months and two days, and breaking the previous record held by Jim Fitzgerald, who ran at Riverside International Raceway in 1987 at age 65. Shepherd started 41st and finished in the same spot in a start-and-park effort, completing 92 of 301 laps.

Shepherd attempted to make the 2014 Daytona 500 in the No. 93 for BK Racing in collaboration with MacDonald Motorsports, but failed to qualify. Had he made the race, he would have been the oldest driver in Daytona 500 history. At the following race at Phoenix, Shepherd drove Joe Nemechek's No. 87 Toyota, extending his record as the oldest driver to compete in a Cup Series race.

Shepherd also ran the 2014 Camping World RV Sales 301 for Circle Sport Racing. He was the subject of a Joey Logano complaint when the 24-year old Logano was involved in an accident with Shepherd. Logano argued, "I feel like there should be a driving test before you get out in a Cup car to make sure you know how to drive before you drive one ... If you're 10 laps down, what are you even doing?" NASCAR defended Shepherd, saying his speed was monitored and he ran at a reasonable pace. Logano was credited with a 40th-place finish while Shepherd, who was the last car running, albeit 27 laps behind the leaders, finished 39th. Shepherd had last finished a Cup race at the 2004 Pepsi 400.

Xfinity Series

Driving for Ed Whitaker and Lindy White

Shepherd made his Busch Series debut at Hickory Motor Speedway in 1982, the series' inaugural season. That year, he drove twelve races for Ed Whitaker. At Hickory, Shepherd won his first race in only his second start in the series. Later that season, he won at Indianapolis Raceway Park. Shepherd scored a total of eight top-five finishes that season, also earning the pole position twice. Despite only starting twelve of the twenty-nine races in the schedule, Shepherd finished eleventh in the final points standings for that year.

In 1983 Shepherd drove 18 races for Whitaker, winning at Bristol and Richmond International Raceway, but dropping to eighteenth in the final standings. Additionally, Shepherd started from the pole at Charlotte. For 1984 Shepherd moved to Lindy White Racing. Shepherd finished in the top-ten six times that season, winning a total of three races at Bristol, Indianapolis Raceway Park, and Martinsville. He stayed with Lindy White for 1985 but had a difficult season. Due to mechanical problems Shepherd only finished three of the eleven races he started that season.

Shepherd had his best Busch series season in 1986, winning four races, all of them for Whitaker. He won at Martinsville, Bristol, Dover and Rockingham. Shepherd also made his first start for his own team at Martinsville, but retired at lap 133 due to steering problems.

Driving for his own team

Shepherd continued to enter his own car for the 1987 season, driving the No. 97 Buick. He started the year with a fifth-place finish at Daytona. A few races later at Bristol, Shepherd won his first race of the season. At Oxford he drove the No. 68 Pontiac for Dale Shaw. Shepherd dominated the early part of the race but retired from the race on 101 after an axle broke on the car. At Road Atlanta Shepherd scored his second win of the season. It was the only time in his career that he won on a road course. At Darlington Shepherd led 42 laps but finished second to Harry Gant. Shepherd won final race of the season at Rockingham after a photo finish with Geoff Bodine.
Shepherd struggled in the 1988 season as his team was afflicted by mechanical issues and crashes throughout the year; An engine failure at Daytona after Shepherd led the early laps, retiring from the lead at Darlington after transmission problems, a crash at Nazareth after leading 31 laps and another engine failure at Dover after Shepherd had led the early part of that race. The highlight of the season was a lone win at Indianapolis Raceway Park after Shepherd took the lead with 7 laps to go. It was the final Busch win of Shepherd's career.

Shepherd cut back on his Busch schedule in 1989, only running two races in his No. 97. He also made two starts for David Pearson, winning the pole at Bristol. Shepherd dominated the early part of that race but retired halfway through the race after having handling issues. In 1990 Shepherd made three starts in his No. 97 Ford with a best finish of third at Rockingham. He also made nine starts for Mike Swaim finishing fourth at Nazareth and Loudon. For 1991 Shepherd increased his schedule to sixteen races with sponsorship from Texas Pete Sauces. His season, however, was plagued by mechanical problems and Shepherd only finished four races, with a best of fifth at Richmond.

After he ran three races in his No. 97 Ford in 1992, Shepherd renumbered his car to match the No. 21 he drove for the Wood Brothers in the Cup series. Shepherd had a good run going at Loudon but retired after 203 laps. His best finish of the season was a third-place at Charlotte. Shepherd continued to race his No. 21 Ford till the 1995 season. He struggled to get results and could only score three top-ten finishes in sixteen races.

Substitute driver

Shepherd made two starts for Bobby Jones Racing in the 1996 season, but he failed to finish any of those races. Shepherd returned to Jones for two races in 1997 with a best finish of sixteenth at Bristol. Shepherd also entered his own car for two races but only managed to qualify for the race at Michigan. In 1998 Shepherd made one start for Mac Martin at Fort Worth. Shepherd also entered his own car for two races but failed to qualify for both of those races.

For 1999 partnered with Bruce Hanusosky to form High Tech Performance. The team planned to run at least fifteen races but after Shepherd failed to qualify for the first two attempts the partnership dissolved. Later that season Shepherd made two attempts for Ed Whitaker but he failed to qualify for those races as well. Shepherd joined Xpress Motorsports for the race at Rockingham and qualified in the eleventh position. In the race, Shepherd scored his most recent top-ten finish with a 10th-place finish. For the next two seasons, Shepherd attempted occasional races with different owners but he failed to make any of those races.

Shepherd joined Davis Motorsports for the 2003 season, driving their No. 0 and No. 70 Chevy. Shepherd qualified for 10 of 12 races he entered with the team. His best finish was an 11th-place finish at Talladega. Later in the season, Shepherd partnered with Dayne Miller. Shepherd only qualified for 4 of the 10 races he entered with Miller. In 2004 Shepherd made 9 attempts with a bunch of different teams. Shepherd only qualified for two races and he failed to finish any of those. In 2006 Shepherd returned to Davis Motorsports and made five starts in a start and park effort.

Forming his own team
After several years of competing part-time for several teams, Shepherd began fielding his No. 89 in 2007. Shepherd would start and park the majority of the schedule but did qualify for 16 of the 20 races he attempted in his self owned Dodge. He also ran 5 races for JD Motorsports. For 2008, Shepherd announced intentions to run the full Nationwide Series schedule for the first time in his career. While he would miss the opening race at Daytona, Shepherd would rebound, making the next 7 races before missing the race at Mexico City. The following week at Talladega, Shepherd would finish 13th, his best finish in the series since 2003. It would also elevate the 89 team to the top 30 in points, locking them into the races. Unfortunately, 2007 would end on a sour note, with Shepherd and team missing 4 of the final 5 races of the season. 2009 would see a big change come to the team, with Shepherd leaving Dodge, who he had been with primarily since 2004, and joining Chevrolet. At Daytona, Shepherd would secure a starting spot in the race, his first Daytona February start in the series since 1994. The first half of 2009 would see Shepherd only miss races, and score a best finish of 13th at Las Vegas. The second half of the season would once again prove difficult, missing 11 races. 2010 would start with mixed results, a strong showing at Daytona was followed by two straight DNQs. Shepherd and his team would receive a big break. Following the release of John Wes Townley from Richard Childress Racing, Zaxby's, which is owned by Townley's father, cut back sponsorship of the 21 team. Childress would make a deal with Shepherd and his team, Faith Motorsports. The alliance would run as Shepherd Racing Ventures and would allow Shepherd to drive the 21 car to keep it up in owner points, as well as run full-time with limited sponsorship from Zaxby's. The 89 Faith Motorsports Chevy would run as a start and park effort when Shepherd was behind the 21.

For 2011, the 89 would return full-time under the Shepherd Racing Ventures moniker, with the RCR/SVR 21 becoming the 89. This would guarantee the 89 into the first 5 races of the season. 2011 would be one of his strongest seasons, running all 33 races, as well as having sponsorship for the majority of the season. However, Shepherd and team's success would turn sour late in the season, as mechanical failures and accidents would plague Shepherd. During the 2011 Wypall 200 at Phoenix, Shepherd was en route to his best finish of the season. However, he was caught up in a late incident.

The 2012 season turned out to be a real struggle for Shepherd. The team lacked owner points and Shepherd had to qualify on time for the races. Because of that, they missed ten races. The team also lacked sponsorship and in most races the team only had one set of tires and could only run the race for as long as that set of tires lasted. Shepherd only finished 2 races that season. He did become the oldest driver to lead a Nationwide Series race when he led 3 laps at Richmond. Shepherd dropped to 29th in the final point standings.

Shepherd's struggles continued in 2013. Before the start of the season Nascar cut the Nationwide field to 40 cars. This was a big blow to Shepherd and his team as it was now even harder to qualify for the races. After failing to qualify for the first two races he attempted that season, Shepherd announced that the lack of sponsorship forced him to scale back on his schedule. He stated that he did not know if or when he would be attending another race event in 2013 due to non-funding. Shepherd returned at Richmond, but again failed to make the race. Shepherd did qualify for the next race at Talladega, but retired on lap 72 because of a fuel pressure problem. He would qualify for seven additional races that season, finishing only once at the fall race at Dover.

Shepherd became the oldest driver to lead a Nationwide Series race at the age of 70 when he led 3 laps in the 2012 Virginia 529 College Savings 250 at Richmond International Raceway. Shepherd extended this record when he led one lap in the 2016 Sparks Energy 300 at Talladega Superspeedway. Shepherd was 74 during this race, he again extended the record when he led during the 2016 Subway Firecracker 250 at Daytona. The record was extended once more during the 2017 VFW Sport Clips Help a Hero 200 at the Darlington Raceway at age 75.

Personal life
According to Shepherd, he had a spiritual awakening on February 23, 1975. After years of extramarital affairs and excessive drinking, he was returning from Speedweeks when he discovered that his third wife had left him. Following a week of partying, Shepherd awoke that Sunday and vowed to change his life for the better, explaining in a 2005 interview, "When I got done praying, I'm not kidding you, I felt like I could jump straight through the roof. It was like a load was taken off of me and life has not been the same since."

Shepherd has been married to his sixth wife, Cindy since 1994. He has six children and ten grandchildren. When not at the race track, Shepherd is involved in several religious causes, and also hosts a charity event for disabled Americans during the offseason.

In 2008, one of his sons, Clay Morgan Shepherd Jr., was arrested and charged for indecent behavior toward children and showing child pornography to young children. According to the prosecution, Clay had sexually exposed himself to four girls between the ages of seven and 11, along with fondling an eight-year old girl. Two of the victims were related to Clay. He would take a plea deal, serving six months in jail and having to be labeled a sex offender for the next 10 years. In response, Morgan would say that the punishment was deserved and that he advocated for more prison time for Clay, saying that "He needs to face God's vengeance and justice, too. I feel like some justice has been done here, but I feel like he should have been given more jail time."

In November 2020, Shepherd revealed that he had been diagnosed with Parkinson's disease.

Motorsports career results

NASCAR
(key) (Bold – Pole position awarded by qualifying time. Italics – Pole position earned by points standings or practice time. * – Most laps led.)

Grand National Series

Sprint Cup Series

Daytona 500

Xfinity Series

Camping World Truck Series

 Season still in progress
 Ineligible for series points

ARCA Bondo/Mar-Hyde Series
(key) (Bold – Pole position awarded by qualifying time. Italics – Pole position earned by points standings or practice time. * – Most laps led.)

References

External links

 
 
 

Living people
1941 births
People from Wilkes County, North Carolina
Racing drivers from North Carolina
NASCAR drivers
NASCAR team owners
ARCA Menards Series drivers
American evangelicals
American Speed Association drivers
Richard Childress Racing drivers